Green Spring Plantation in James City County about  west of Williamsburg, was the 17th century plantation of one of the most unpopular governors of Colonial Virginia in North America, Sir William Berkeley, and his wife, Frances Culpeper Berkeley.

Sir William Berkeley, who served several terms, is perhaps the best-known of Virginia's colonial governors. Contrary to popular belief the well-known Berkeley Plantation in nearby Charles City County was not named in his honor.

Today, a section of the land that formed the core of Green Spring Plantation is part of the Colonial National Historical Park. It also lends its name to the section of the multi-use Virginia Capital Trail that extends from Governor Berkeley's capital at Jamestown, past many former great plantations (including Berkeley plantation) to the current state capital at Richmond, Virginia.

History
The name Green Spring Plantation originated from the natural spring on the site, which continues over 350 years later to produce huge quantities of very beautifully clear, ultra cold water. The Green Spring produced a flow "so very cold that 'twas dangerous drinking the water thereof in Summer-time," wrote a visitor in the 1680s."

The plantation house at Green Spring was built in 1645. The plantation originally encompassed a  experimental farm.

Seeking alternative export products to supplement tobacco, which had become the Colony's mainstay, Green Spring produced flax, fruits, potash, rice, silk, and spirits, which were shipped to markets in North America, the West Indies, Great Britain, and Holland.

The plantation was owned by Governor William Berkeley until his death in 1677. When Berkeley's widow Lady Frances married Philip Ludwell, ownership passed to him, and then to his son Philip Ludwell II and grandson Philip Ludwell III.

On March 13, 1683, the Council determined that Greenspring windmill was to be the site of the building of the King's storehouse.

Green Spring Plantation witnessed many historic events, including the beginnings of slavery in Virginia, Bacon's Rebellion in 1676, the Battle of Green Spring during the American Revolutionary War in 1781, and the emancipation of its slaves in 1804, by the will of William Ludwell Lee, son of William Lee. In 1862, the property was also involved in the Battle of Williamsburg during the Peninsula Campaign of the American Civil War. A second mansion on the site was burned during the Civil War.

Preservation
The site includes archaeological and architectural remnants of the manor house and ancillary structures. It was listed on the National Register of Historic Places on December 29, 1978. It has been argued by historian Virginia B. Price that numerous Virginia county courthouses, including Hanover, King William, and Nelson, are, “arguably, the Green Spring house’s architectural legacy.”

See also 
 Colonial National Historical Park
 Colonial Williamsburg
 Jamestown, Virginia

References

External links 
 Friends of Green Spring a large interactive web site with streaming video and more than a dozen essays ("The voices of Green Spring")
 National Park Service, Green Spring web page
 Friends of the National Park Service for Green Spring Plantation
 Greenspring, State Route 614 vicinity, Williamsburg, Williamsburg, VA at the Historic American Buildings Survey (HABS)
 Philip Ludwell III and Early American Orthodoxy | Ludwell.org
 Discourse and View of Virginia
 Green Spring Pathway to Freedom

Protected areas of James City County, Virginia
James River plantations
Houses on the National Register of Historic Places in Virginia
Houses completed in 1645
National Register of Historic Places in James City County, Virginia
Colonial National Historical Park
Historic American Buildings Survey in Virginia
Houses in James City County, Virginia
Burned houses in the United States
1645 establishments in Virginia